The Roots Come Alive is a live album from the group The Roots.

It was recorded in Zurich, Switzerland; New York City; and other places and released November 2, 1999. An enhanced double-CD edition containing six extra tracks, music videos and photos was also released with a limited pressing. The album title is a reference to the popular live album Frampton Comes Alive.

Track listing

Continuation from The Legendary

Album chart positions

References

External links
 The Roots Come Alive at Discogs
 Album article at Billboard

The Roots albums
Albums produced by Questlove
1999 live albums
MCA Records live albums
Live hip hop albums